Anthanassa texana, the Texan crescentspot, is a species of butterfly in the family Nymphalidae. It is found from Guatemala north through Mexico to southern California, east across the southern United States to northern Florida, Georgia and South Carolina. Strays may be found up to Arkansas, Missouri, Illinois, South Dakota, and central Nevada. The habitat consists of deserts, dry gulches, open areas, streamsides, road edges, and city parks.

The wingspan is 32–48 mm. The outer margin is indented below the tip of the forewing. The upperside is black with small white spots and some rusty red near the wing bases. The hindwings have a median band of cream-colored spots. Adults are on wing from March to November in southern Florida and Arizona. They are on wing year round in southern Texas and the tropics. There are several generations per year. Adults feed on flower nectar.

The larvae feed on the leaves of various low-growing plants of the family Acanthaceae, including Diciliptera brachiata, Jacobinia carnea, Beloperone, Siphonoglossa, and Ruellia species.

Subspecies
Anthanassa texana texana (Arizona, Texas, New Mexico, Nebraska, Mexico)

Anthanassa texana seminole (Skinner, 1911) (Florida, Georgia)

References

Butterflies described in 1863
Melitaeini
Taxa named by William Henry Edwards
Butterflies of Central America
Butterflies of North America